Oleg Borisovich Vidov (June 11, 1943 – May 15, 2017) was a Russian–American actor, film director and producer. He appeared in 50 films beginning in 1961. A emigrant from his native Soviet Union, he was granted U.S. citizenship and became a naturalized American.

Early life
Oleg Vidov was born in either the Leninsky District, Moscow Oblast or Vidnoye, Moscow Oblast to Varvara Ivanovna Vidova, a teacher and a school principal, and Boris Nikolaievich Garnevich, an economist and a Finance Ministry deputy. According to Garnevich's fifth wife, Irina Vavilova, Garnevich was an influential man and served as an assistant of Lazar Kaganovich. Vidov was raised by his mother under her surname. He spent his childhood in Russia, Mongolia and East Germany where his mother was assigned to work. When she was sent to China, he went to live with his aunt Anuta in Kazakhstan near the Chinese border. Eventually all of them moved to Moscow.

Career
Vidov played his first episodic role in 1960 in the teen drama My Friend, Kolka! In 1962 he entered actor's courses at VGIK led by Yakov Segel and Yuri Pobedonostsev.

As a student he acted in a number of movies, including main parts in The Blizzard and An Ordinary Miracle (both from 1964). He graduated in 1966 and continued his active movie career. He was also noticed by foreign directors and was given permission to perform in such films as Hagbard and Signe (by Denmark, Sweden and Iceland) and Battle of Neretva (by Yugoslavia, Italy, West Germany and the United States), as well as a joined Soviet-Italian-American production Waterloo.

In 1970 he met and married actress Natalia Vasilievna Fedotova. According to the most popular version, she was a daughter of the powerful KGB general Vasily Fedotov known for his friendship with Leonid Brezhnev and his daughter, Galina. Vidov denied it, claiming that his father-in-law was in fact a professor of Russian history who worked at university, although he admitted that Brezhneva was a close friend of his wife. They had a son Vyacheslav. Soon Vidov started dating a VGIK student Malvina Vishnya, which led to public scandal. He filed for divorce in 1976. Fedotova and Brezhneva then reportedly used their influence to ruin Vidov's career.

Directors stopped offering him big roles, and when in 1978 he himself finished director's courses at VGIK led by Efim Dzigan, he couldn't receive his diploma until Stanislav Rostotsky stepped in and awarded his short film Crossing with the highest mark.

In 1983 Vidov was given permission to live and work in Yugoslavia with his second wife, a Yugoslavian actress.

In May 1985, Soviet authorities unexpectedly required him to return to Moscow within 72 hours, so an Austrian actor friend helped procure an Austrian visa for him. Together they drove to the Yugoslavian-Austrian border where he escaped into Austria. Vidov was then able to emigrate to the U.S. under a refugee visa from the U.S. embassy in Rome obtained with the help of the International Rescue Committee.

In the U.S., he married Joan Borsten, daughter of Hollywood publicist, scriptwriter and studio executive Orin Borsten (1912–2005). The couple garnered the international distribution rights to the award-winning Soyuzmultfilm Studio animation library in 1992 and helped popularize Soviet animation around the world.

In 2007 Vidov co-founded Malibu Beach Recovery Center, a well-respected alcohol and drug treatment program based on the principles of neuroscience in Malibu, California. Vidov served as chairman of the board, and his wife Joan as CEO, until June 2014 when they sold the center to a medical investment branch of Wells Fargo Bank. The Malibu Beach Recovery Center has been featured on television shows such as A&E's Intervention.

Death
Vidov died on May 15, 2017, from complications following a battle with cancer at his Westlake Village, California home at the age of 73. He is interred at Hollywood Forever Cemetery.

Selected filmography

 My Friend, Kolka! (1961) (uncredited)
 The End of the World (1962) as Vanya
 An Easy Life (1963) as theater visitor
 Esli ty prav... (1964)
 Walking the Streets of Moscow (1964) as Chap on a Bicycle (uncredited)
 I Am Twenty (1965) (uncredited)
 The Blizzard (1965) as Vladimir
 An Ordinary Miracle (1965)
 The Tale of Tsar Saltan (1967) as Tsarevich Gvidon
 Hagbard and Signe (1967) as Hagbard
 Uzrok smrti ne pominjati (1968) as Nemacki pukovnik
 Ima ljubavi, nema ljubavi (1968)
 Battle of Neretva (1969) as Nikola
 Waterloo (1970) as Tomlinson
 Mission in Kabul (1970) as Skazkin
 Gentlemen of Fortune (1971) as Lieutenant Vladimir Slavin
 Lion's Grave (1971) as Masheka
 Tecumseh (1972) as Elliot 
 Lützower (1972) as Major Margent
 Train Stop — Two Minutes (1972, TV Movie) as Igor Maksimov
 Za vsyo v otvete (1973) 
 The Headless Horseman (1973) as Morris Gerald
 Adventures of Mowgli (1973) (voice)
 All in Response (1973) as presenter
 Moscow, My Love (1974) as Wolodja
 Pokoj, rci, jad (1975) as Gavriil
 Ivanov's Family (1975) as Nikolai Osintsev
 Rudin (1977) as Sergey Pavlovich Volyntsev
 Die Fledermaus (1979, TV Movie) as Alfred
 Urgent ... Secret ... Hubchek (1982) as Staff Captain Petrov
 Cry of Silence (1983) as Pavel Kolchin, the huntsman
 Demidovs (1984) as Nefyodov
  (1985, TV miniseries) as Ivan
 Orkestar jedne mladosti (1985) as Brauske
 U zatvoru (1985) as Slobodan
 Red Heat (1988) as Yuri Ogarkov
 Wild Orchid (1990) as Otto Munch
 Three Days in August (1992) as Gen. Vlasov
 Prisoner of Time (1993) as Alexander Jadov
 Love Affair (1994) as Russian Businessman
 The Immortals (1995) as Junkyard Owner
 Police Story 4: First Strike (1996) as Russian Group #7
 2090 (1996) as Tony
 Wishmaster 2: Evil Never Dies (1999) as Osip Krutchkov
 A Christmas Tree and a Wedding (2000) as Man
 Thirteen Days (2000) as Valerian Zorin
 Monkey Love (2002) as Professor Dworkin
 Alias (2005-2006, TV Series) as Laborer
 Say It in Russian (2007) as Drunk Russian Man
 Player 5150 (2008) as Russian Dignitary
 Hollywood Seagull (2013) as Nina's Grandfather
 6 Days Dark (2014) as Sergej Nikolajevich

References

External links

 Олег Видов на сайте КТО ЕСТЬ КТО

1943 births
2017 deaths
Soviet male actors
Russian male film actors
Russian male television actors
People from Moscow Oblast
American people of Russian descent
Soviet emigrants to the United States
Soviet defectors
Russian voice directors
Honored Artists of the RSFSR
Gerasimov Institute of Cinematography alumni
Burials at Hollywood Forever Cemetery